Coleophora gardesanella is a moth of the family Coleophoridae. It has a disjunct distribution, from Finland to the Pyrenees and Italy, and from Great Britain to the Baltic States and North Macedonia.

The wingspan is 9.5–11 mm. Adults are on wing from June to August in western Europe.

The larvae feed on Achillea millefolium, Achillea ptarmica, Artemisia maritima, Artemisia vulgaris, Centaurea jacea, Chrysanthemum leucanthemum and Tanacetum vulgare. They create a straw-coloured to grey, slender, three-valved, tubular, silken case. The mouth angle is 45°– 60°. Larvae can be found from September to May.

References

gardesanella
Moths described in 1954
Moths of Europe